Château de Wasselonne is a castle in the commune of Wasselonne, in the department of Bas-Rhin, Alsace, France. Of the original medieval castle, only the entrance gate and the big artillery tower and some walls remain. It is a listed historical monument since 1932.

References

Castles in Bas-Rhin
Monuments historiques of Bas-Rhin